Shorea negrosensis (called, along with some other species in the genus Shorea, red lauan) is a species of plant in the family Dipterocarpaceae. It is endemic to the Philippines.

References

negrosensis
Endemic flora of the Philippines
Trees of the Philippines
Taxonomy articles created by Polbot
Least concern plants